Thermo may refer to:

 Adobe Thermo, a designers' tool for creating the user interface for Rich Internet Application by Adobe Systems
 Heat, energy transferred from one system to another by thermal interaction
 Thermo Fisher Scientific, a healthcare equipment company
 Thermo, Greece, a town in Aetolia-Acarnania, Greece
 Thermodynamics, the branch of physical science concerned with heat and its relation to other forms of energy and work
 Thermos, an insulating storage vessel which keeps its contents hotter or cooler than its surroundings
 Thermo (journal), an academic journal published by MDPI

See also